Bernardo Onori (born 6 October 1946) is an Italian boxer. He competed in the men's bantamweight event at the 1976 Summer Olympics. At the 1976 Summer Olympics, he beat Abdelnabi El-Sayed and Brian Tink before losing to Charles Mooney.

References

1946 births
Living people
Italian male boxers
Olympic boxers of Italy
Boxers at the 1976 Summer Olympics
Boxers from Rome
Bantamweight boxers
20th-century Italian people